Billy Jones Lake is a tarn located on Hurricane Divide in the Eagle Cap Wilderness of Northeastern Oregon, United States. It is situated less than one mile from Echo Lake.

Trail
The trail to Billy Jones Lake begins at Hurricane Creek Trailhead. The starting trail number is 1807 but turns into trail number 1824. The trail passes Echo Lake before reaching Billy Jones Lake. The first  (of ) are heavily traveled in the summer and fall. However, the last three miles are lightly used, and are exceptionally difficult to climb, rising .

References 

Lakes of Oregon
Lakes of Wallowa County, Oregon
Eagle Cap Wilderness
Protected areas of Wallowa County, Oregon